The June sucker (Chasmistes liorus) is an endangered species of fish endemic to Utah Lake and the Provo River in the U.S. state of Utah. It lives alongside the Utah sucker, which has a much wider range, and because the populations of both fish having been much reduced by fishing, other species such as the common carp have been introduced into the lake. As a result, the June sucker has become "critically endangered" as the pure species is lost as a result of hybridization with the Utah sucker, and predatory fish feed on its larvae. Conservation measures have been put in place and fish are being raised in a fish hatchery for reintroduction.

Description
It is a member of the sucker family Catostomidae, and occurs in sympatry with the benthic Utah sucker Catostomus ardens. Unlike most other suckers, the June sucker is not a bottom-feeder. Its mouth is more rostrally oriented, allowing it to collect zooplankton from the midwater. The fish is dark gray or brownish dorsally, with a white or slightly greenish belly. It has a lifespan over 40 years. Typical specimens range from 17 to 24 in (43 to 61 cm) and reach a weight of 5 lb (2.3 kg.)

Distribution
The June sucker is known only from Utah Lake in the United States, its feeder streams, and the adjacent Provo River.

Status
This species was once plentiful in its native lake. Some contributions to its decline include predation on its young by introduced species such as the common carp and walleye, pollution and turbidity, drought, alteration of water flow, and loss of some native vegetation. It also hybridizes with the Utah sucker (Catostomus ardens) and unhybridized fish may not remain.

Biologists have been rearing the June sucker in Red Butte Reservoir, and more recently in the Springville, Utah, fish hatchery, which had been closed due to an outbreak of whirling disease. As whirling disease does not affect June suckers, the hatchery was reopened to house them. After the June suckers grow to a certain size, they are released into Utah Lake to help build the population.

The June Sucker Recovery Implementation Program coordinates and implements recovery actions for the June sucker.

References

 June Sucker Recovery Implementation Program
 Species Profile for June sucker. US Fish & Wildlife Service.
 June sucker Utah Conservation Data Center.
 June Sucker Utah Reclamation Mitigation and Conservation Commission.
 Endangered June suckers now raised at second hatchery. Utah Division of Wildlife Resources.
 Geographic patterns of genetic variation in Utah sucker. Utah sucker genetics.

Catostomidae
Endemic fauna of Utah
Fish of the Western United States
Freshwater fish of the United States
Fish described in 1878
Endangered fish
Critically endangered fauna of the United States
ESA endangered species
Taxa named by David Starr Jordan